Sir Colin John Giltrap  (born 1940) is a New Zealand businessman involved in the motor vehicle industry. In the 2012 New Year Honours, he was appointed a Knight Companion of the New Zealand Order of Merit, for services to motorsport and philanthropy. He was inducted into the New Zealand Business Hall of Fame in 2013.

References

Date of birth missing (living people)
1940 births
Living people
New Zealand businesspeople
Knights Companion of the New Zealand Order of Merit
Businesspeople awarded knighthoods
New Zealand philanthropists
New Zealand people of Irish descent